Azhdarchoidea (or azhdarchoids) is a group of pterosaurs within the suborder Pterodactyloidea, more specifically within the group Ornithocheiroidea. Pterosaurs belonging to this group lived throughout the Early and Late Cretaceous periods, with one tentative member, Tendaguripterus, that lived in the Late Jurassic period. The largest azhdarchoids include members of the family Azhdarchidae, examples of these are Quetzalcoatlus, Hatzegopteryx, and Arambourgiania. The Azhdarchoidea has been recovered as either closely related to the Ctenochasmatoidea, as the sister taxon of the Pteranodontoidea within the Ornithocheiroidea, or within the Tapejaroidea, which in turn was also within the Ornithocheiroidea.

Classification
Azhdarchoidea was given a phylogenetic definition by David Unwin in 2003. Unwin defined the group as the most recent common ancestor of Quetzalcoatlus and Tapejara, and all its descendants.

There have been several competing views of azhdarchoid relationships. The first, presented by Felipe Pinheiro and colleagues in 2011, considered the tapejarids to be a monophyletic clade including the thalassodromines and chaoyangopterines. The second, found by Naish & Martill (2006), as well as Lü et al. (2008), considered the traditional "tapejarids" to be a paraphyletic grade of primitive azhdarchoids. with true tapejarids most basal, and the thalassodromines (alternatively called thalassodromids) and chaoyangopterids being successively more closely related to azhdarchids. All azhdarchoids which are part of the clade formed by Quetzalcoatlus and Tupuxuara are included in the group Neoazhdarchia ("new azhdarchids") as defined by Unwin in 2003.

In 1996, Alexander Kellner created a different clade called Tapejaroidea, which he defined as the most recent common ancestor and all descendants of Tapejara, Quetzalcoatlus, and Dsungaripterus. Kellner created this clade to include both Azhdarchoidea and the family Dsungaripteridae, but as separate groups. A lot of recent studies have followed this concept.

There are competing theories of azhdarchoid phylogeny; it is either recovered as closely related to the clade Ctenochasmatoidea, or within the group Ornithocheiroidea, either as the sister taxon of the Pteranodontoidea or within the clade Tapejaroidea. The latter two of which are more widely accepted. Below is a cladogram showing the results of a phylogenetic analysis presented by Andres and colleagues in 2014. This study found the a grouping of tapejarids at the base of the clade, with thalassodromines more closely related to azhdarchids and chaoyangopterids, as well as dsungaripterids. Their cladogram is shown below.

The result of a more recent phylogenetic analysis, by Kellner and colleagues in 2019, had recovered Azhdarchoidea within the larger group Tapejaroidea. Unlike the analysis by Andres and colleagues, Kellner and colleagues had found Azhdarchoidea to only consist of three groups: Azhdarchidae, Chaoyangopteridae, and Tapejaromorpha. Their cladogram is shown below.

In 2022, Pêgas et al. named and officially registered two new clades: Azhdarchomorpha, the most inclusive clade containing Azhdarcho but not Tapejara or Thalassodromeus, and Alanqidae, containing Alanqa but not Chaoyangopterus or Azhdarcho. Their phylogeny is shown below:

References

 
Tithonian first appearances
Maastrichtian extinctions